A burdei or bordei is a type of pit-house or half-dugout shelter, somewhat between a sod house and a log cabin. This style is native to the Carpathian Mountains and forest steppes of Eastern Europe.

History

Neolithic 
In the Cucuteni-Trypillian culture burdei houses were characterized by elliptical shapes. These houses would typically have a wooden floor that was about 1.5 meters (5 feet) below ground, which would place the roof at just above ground level.

Early middle ages 
The term used by western historians, for burdei-type housing on the Lower Danube and in the Carpathians during the 6th–7th centuries AD, is Grubenhaus. Poluzemlianki is used by Russian researchers. The Russian term refers to a structure partially dug into the ground, often less than 1 m deep.

The Grubenhaus was erected over a rectangular pit, ranging in size from four square meters to twenty-five square meters of floor area. During the 6th and 7th centuries the sunken buildings east and south of the Carpathians, were under 15 square meters in floor surface.
The experiments of the Archeological Open-Air Museum in Březno near Louny have reconstructed the living and temperature conditions in the dug houses.
The building experiment consisted of two houses, which were exact replicas of two sunken buildings excavated on the site, one of the late sixth or early seventh century, the other of the ninth. The sixth- to seventh-century feature was relatively large (4.20 x 4.60 m) and deep (80 cm under the original ground). The excavation of the rectangular pit represented some fifteen cubic meters of earth. The excavation, as well as other, more complex, operations, such as binding horizontal sticks on the truss or felling and transport of trees, required a minimum of two persons. The building of the house took 860 hours, which included the felling of trees for rafters and the overall preparation of the wood. Building the actual house required 2.2 cubic meters of wood (ash, oak, and beech). In itself, the superstructure swallowed two cubic meters of wood. Three to four cubic meters of clay were necessary for daubing the walls and reeds harvested from some 1,000 square meters, for the covering of the superstructure. Assuming sixty to seventy working hours per week and a lot more experience and skills for the early medieval builders, the house may have been built in three to four weeks.59 -Florin Curta.Pleinerová 1986:113–14 and 139. Various prohibitions (e.g., selection of the building site, propitious time for starting the building, etc.), as well as a number of ritual practices pertaining to the symbolism attached to the house, some of which are known from the ethnographic evidence, may have considerably delayed the building process.

Eastern Europe 

In countries like Romania or Ukraine, the burdei was built to constitute a permanent housing place and could accommodate a whole family. Thus, a burdei could have multiple rooms, typically a fire-room where the stove was installed, a cellar, and a living room.

North America 
This type of shelter was created by many of the earliest Ukrainian Canadian settlers as their first home in Canada at the end of the 19th century. The first step was to peel back and save the sod, then excavate the earth to a depth of approximately a metre. A poplar roof frame was then created, over which the saved sod would be laid. Then a window, a door, a wood stove, and a bed platform would be installed. A typical burdei measured no more than two by four metres. The burdei was a temporary refuge until a "proper" home of poplar logs and mud/straw plaster could be built.

Mennonites from Imperial Russia settled in the Hillsboro region of Kansas, and also built burdei housings as temporary shelters. This type of shelter was also called a zemlyanka or a saraj (a Low German spelling for a Russian word meaning "shed").  The March 20, 1875, issue of the national weekly newspaper Frank Leslie's Illustrated Newspaper described the structures:

See also 

 ASTRA National Museum Complex
 Culture of Romania
 Cucuteni-Trypillian culture
 Dugout (shelter)
 Earth sheltering
 Pit-house
 Ukrainian Cultural Heritage Village
 Vernacular architecture of the Carpathians
 Village Museum
 Vernacular architecture
 Zemlyanka

Notes

External links 
 Shelter from the Rain Article and pictures of Ukrainian burdeis in Canada.

House types
Huts
Canadian architectural styles
Housing in Canada
Ukrainian-Canadian culture
Architecture in Ukraine
Architecture in Romania
Mennonitism
Semi-subterranean structures
Vernacular architecture